This is a timeline documenting events of Jazz in the year 1917.

Musicians born in this year included Dizzy Gillespie, Ella Fitzgerald and Thelonious Monk.

Events

February
 26 – The Original Dixieland Jazz Band records the first jazz album, Livery Stable Blues. It was a success and paved the way for the first jazz records in US music shops.

Standards

 In 1917 standards such as "Indiana" and "Tiger Rag" appeared.

Deaths

 April
 1 – Scott Joplin, American composer and pianist (born 1868).

Births

 January
 9 – Jimmy Maxwell, American trumpeter (died 2002).
 10 – Jerry Wexler, American music journalist and music producer (died 2008).
 14 – Billy Butterfield, American band leader, trumpeter, flugelhornist and cornetist (died 1988).
 16 – Sandy Block, American bassist (died 1985).
 19
 Shep Shepherd, American drummer and trombonist (died 2018).
 Streamline Ewing, American jazz trombonist (died 2002).
 21 – Billy Maxted, American pianist (died 2001).
 22 – Pud Brown, American reedist (died 1996).
 23 – Fred Beckett, American trombonist (died 1946).
 24 – Avery Parrish, American pianist and songwriter (died 1959).
 25 – Floyd Smith, American guitarist and record producer (died 1982).

 February
 21 – Tadd Dameron, American pianist and composer (died 1965).
 23 – John Benson Brooks, American pianist, songwriter, arranger, and composer (died 1999).
 28 – Max Jones, British jazz author, radio host, and journalist (died 1993).

 March
 1 – Aimé Barelli, French trumpeter, vocalist, and band leader (died 1995).
 14 – John Graas, American French horn player, composer, and arranger (died 1962).
 16 – Junior Raglin, American upright bassist (died 1955).
 19
 Buster Harding, Canadian-American pianist, composer, and arranger (died 1965).
 Curley Russell, American upright bassist (died 1986).
 23 – Johnny Guarnieri, American virtuoso jazz and stride pianist (died 1985).
 27 – Dardanelle Hadley, American singer, vibraphonist, pianist, composer, and arranger (died 1997).

 April
 3 – Bill Finegan, American bandleader, pianist, arranger, and composer (died 2008).
 7 – Mongo Santamaría, Afro-Cuban percussionist (died 2003).
 10 – Morty Corb, American upright bassist (died 1996).
 12 – Helen Forrest, American singer (died 1999).
 21 – Joe Dixon, American reedist (died 1998).
 25 – Ella Fitzgerald, American vocalist (died 1996).
 27 – Denzil Best, American percussionist and composer (died 1965).
 30
 Bea Wain, American singer (died 2017).
 Frankie Lee Sims, American singer-songwriter and guitarist (died 1970).

 May
 5 – Dalva de Oliveira, Brazilian singer (internal bleeding) (died 1972).
 22 – Charlie Munro, New Zealand-Australian reedist and flautist (died 1985).
 25 – Jimmy Hamilton, American clarinetist, tenor saxophonist, and composer (died 1995).
 31 – Billie Rogers, American trumpeter and singer (died 2014).

 June
 7 – Dean Martin, American singer, actor, comedian, and film producer (died 1995).
 13 – Si Zentner, American trombonist and big band leader (died 2000).
 19 – Dave Lambert, American lyricist and singer (died 1966).

 July
 18
 Henri Salvador, French-Caribbean comedian and singer (died 2008).
 Joe Comfort, American bassist (died 1988).
 22 – Lou McGarity, American trombonist, violinist and vocalist (died 1971).

 August
 3
 Charlie Shavers, American trumpeter (died 1971).
 Les Elgart, American bandleader and trumpeter (died 1995).
 7 – Mose Vinson, American pianist and singer (died 2002).
 10 – J. C. Heard, American drummer (died 1988).
 30 – Lena Horne, African-American singer, dancer, actress, and civil rights activist (died 2010).

 September
 2
 Armando Trovajoli, Italian film composer and pianist (died 2013).
 Laurindo Almeida, Brazilian virtuoso guitarist and composer (died 1995).
 6 – Johnny Letman, American trumpeter (died 1992).
 11 – John Adriano Acea, American pianist (died 1963).
 24 – Jimmy Butts, American upright bassist (died 1998).
 26 – Nelson Williams, American jazz trumpeter (died 1973).
 30 – Buddy Rich, American jazz drummer and bandleader (died 1987).

 October
 10 – Thelonious Monk, American pianist and composer (died 1982).
 16 – Pat Flowers, American pianist and singer (died 2000).
 21 – Dizzy Gillespie, trumpeter and bandleader (died 1993).
 24 – Mike Pedicin, American saxophonist and bandleader (died 2016).

 November
 7 – Howard Rumsey, American upright bassist (died 2015).
 11 – Sonny White, American pianist (died 1971).
 18 – Boots Mussulli, Italian-American saxophonist (died 1967).

 December
 2 – Sylvia Syms (singer), American singer (died 1992).
 4 – Russell Jacquet, American trumpeter (died 1990).
 18 – Eddie Vinson, American alto saxophonist and blues shouter (died 1988).

 Unknown date
 Garnet Clark, American jazz pianist (died 1938).

References

External links
 History Of Jazz Timeline: 1917 at All About Jazz

Jazz, 1917 In
Jazz by year